Pouteria areolatifolia is a species of plant in the family Sapotaceae. It is endemic to Guatemala.

References

Endemic flora of Guatemala
areolatifolia
Vulnerable plants
Trees of Guatemala
Taxonomy articles created by Polbot